Alexandros Tsemperidis (born 26 July 1986) is a retired Greek professional footballer who played as a defensive midfielder.

Career
Tsemperidis was born on 26 July 1986 in Kastoria. He began his career from the youth teams of Panathinaikos, and in 2005 was given on loan to Proodeftiki and then to Koropi. He has also played in Ilisiakos, Kastoria, Kerkyra, Ethnikos Piraeus, Panachaiki and Apollon Smyrni in which he was a key member. In 2013, he won promotion to the Super League. On 24 January 2014 he signed a 2.5 year contract with AEL.

In October 2019, Tsemperidis suffered an injury to his Anterior cruciate ligament and at the end of February 2020, he announced his retirement from football. However, he continued at Triglia, but in a different role as a technical director. He left this position again in July 2020.

References

External links
 
AEL FC Official Profile
Interview@Crimson Scorer (YouTube Video
My Player Profile

1986 births
Living people
Greek footballers
Athlitiki Enosi Larissa F.C. players
Panathinaikos F.C. players
Kastoria F.C. players
Ilisiakos F.C. players
Kalamata F.C. players
Agrotikos Asteras F.C. players
Proodeftiki F.C. players
Koropi F.C. players
Acharnaikos F.C. players
PAE Kerkyra players
Ethnikos Piraeus F.C. players
Panachaiki F.C. players
Apollon Smyrnis F.C. players
Apollon Pontou FC players
Niki Volos F.C. players
Association football midfielders
Footballers from Kastoria